Neopaschia is a genus of snout moths. It was described by Anthonie Johannes Theodorus Janse in 1922.

Species
 Neopaschia flavociliata Janse, 1922
 Neopaschia lemairei Viette, 1973
 Neopaschia nigromarginata Viette, 1953

References

Epipaschiinae
Pyralidae genera